The following is a list of sovereign states and territories where Tamil is an official language or language of government.

Tamil is the 20th most spoken language in the world. Tamil language speakers make approximately 1.06% of the world population. Tamil was one of the prominent languages of trade in the region during the pre-colonial era. Tamil mercantile guilds like Ainnurruvar were active in Southeast Asia, and there are Tamil inscriptions and coins found in parts of Asia and Africa such as in China, Cambodia, Egypt and Indonesia.

During the 18th century, the British and French colonial rulers brought Tamils to many parts of Asia and Africa where many countries have sizeable number of Tamil speakers with significant cultural impact. There are more than 2,000,000 speakers of Tamil language in Malaysia itself. Tamil is recognized as a classical language by the Government of India and it is the first recognized classical language in India and it is also one of the 22 official languages in India.

Sovereign states

Dependent entities

Recognized as minority language

Partially recognized and unrecognized territories

Former dependent entities where Tamil was an official language

International institutions where Tamil is used

See also
 Tamil population per nation
 Tamil population by cities
 States of India by Tamil speakers
 Tamil Loanwords in other languages
 Tamil language
 Tamil people
 List of languages by first written accounts
 Tamil keyboard

Notes

References